Nikolay Markov may refer to:
Nikolay Markov (sprinter) (born 1960), Bulgarian athlete
Nikolai Markov (general), Soviet military commander in Baku Air Defence Army
Nikolai Yevgenyevich Markov (1866–1945), Russian right-wing politician
Nikolay Markov (footballer) (born 1985), Uzbekistani Russian footballer
Nikolai Markov (architect) (1882–1957), Iranian architect of Russian descent